Joshua Wilson (January 29, 1797 – February 27, 1885) was an American politician and physician from Maryland. He served as a member of the Maryland House of Delegates, representing Harford County from 1860 to 1861 and 1865 to 1867.

Early life
Joshua Wilson was born on January 29, 1797, in Harford County, Maryland. He graduated from the University of Maryland School of Medicine.

Career
In 1819, Wilson made a ride on horseback with Thomas Chew, Tobias Stansbury and Benjamin Rusk to New Orleans to find a location to practice medicine. He chose to practice medicine in Harford County and would practice for 64 years.

Wilson was elected as county commissioner in 1853 and 1857. Wilson served as a member of the Maryland House of Delegates, representing Harford County from 1860 to 1861. He ran for re-election in the 1861 election, but lost. He served again from 1865 to 1867.

Personal life
Wilson married Miss Lee. His wife predeceased him. Wilson had four sons and three daughters, including William, David J., Ralph L., Henry C., Mrs. B. Peyton Brown and Mrs. E. Hall Richardson.

At a later age, Wilson fell and could no longer walk on one leg. Wilson died on February 27, 1885, at his home in Abingdon. He was buried at Mount Carmel Methodist Episcopal Church near Emmorton.

References

1797 births
1885 deaths
People from Abingdon, Maryland
University of Maryland School of Medicine alumni
Members of the Maryland House of Delegates
Physicians from Maryland
19th-century American politicians
19th-century American physicians